Simon David Kinberg (born August 2, 1973) is a British-born American filmmaker. He is best known for his work on the 20th Century Fox X-Men film franchise, and has also written such films as Mr. & Mrs. Smith and Sherlock Holmes. He has served as a producer on others including Cinderella and The Martian, the latter which was nominated for the Academy Award for Best Picture. His production company Genre Films had a first-look deal with 20th Century Fox. Kinberg made his directorial debut in the 2019 X-Men film Dark Phoenix from a script he also wrote.

Early life
Kinberg was born in Hammersmith, London, England to American parents Monica Menell-Kinberg and Jud Kinberg, a New York City-born writer and producer. From age six, he was raised in Los Angeles, California. He is Jewish. Kinberg graduated from Brentwood High School, and then from Brown University, Phi Beta Kappa, magna cum laude; in 2003 received his MFA from Columbia University School of the Arts, where he won the Zaki Gordon Fellowship for Screenwriting.

Film and television work
While still in film school, Kinberg sold a pitch to Warner Brothers, then went on to write scripts for Disney, Sony, and DreamWorks, working with Steven Spielberg and Jerry Bruckheimer, among others. After finishing school, Kinberg moved to Hollywood, where his first screenwriting credit was a sequel to the hit action film XXX (2002), XXX: State of the Union (2005). His next screenwriting venture was the screenplay for Mr. & Mrs. Smith, directed by Doug Liman and starring Brad Pitt and Angelina Jolie. The script began as Kinberg's thesis project for film school. Kinberg also wrote the pilot episode for a television adaptation of Mr. & Mrs. Smith for ABC TV. He also appears in the movie, in a scene with Brad Pitt.

Kinberg's next screenwriting job was the third movie in the 20th Century Fox X-Men film series: X-Men: The Last Stand (2006), which he co-wrote with Zak Penn. Comic-book writer Chris Claremont, who wrote the Dark Phoenix storyline that served as the primary source material for the film, also wrote the novelization of the film and made Kinberg a character in the book.

Kinberg reunited with director Doug Liman for the film Jumper (2008). Kinberg wrote and produced the movie, which stars Samuel L. Jackson, Hayden Christensen, and Diane Lane. The following year, Kinberg was writer of Sherlock Holmes, directed by Guy Ritchie, starring Robert Downey, Jr. and Jude Law. In April 2010, his production company, Genre Films, signed a first-look deal with 20th Century Fox.

Kinberg was the producer of X-Men: First Class (2011), and both writer and producer of This Means War (2012). He was also co-screenwriter and an executive producer of the film Abraham Lincoln: Vampire Hunter in that same year. In 2013, Kinberg produced Elysium.

The following year, Kinberg was the writer and the producer of the film X-Men: Days of Future Past. That same year, he produced Let's Be Cops. In 2015, Kinberg produced the Neill Blomkamp film Chappie and the live-action version of Cinderella at Disney. He also worked on Fantastic Four as writer and producer. His final film of the year was The Martian, directed by Ridley Scott.

He wrote and produced X-Men: Apocalypse, the next film in the X-Men franchise following X-Men: Days of Future Past. Kinberg produced 2016's Deadpool, 2017's Logan, 2018's Deadpool 2, 2019's Dark Phoenix (the latter of which also served as his directorial debut) and The New Mutants, all of which are X-Men spin-off films. He also produced Murder on the Orient Express, an adaptation of the Agatha Christie novel of the same name.

The Hollywood Reporter initially reported that Lawrence Kasdan, writer of The Empire Strikes Back and Return of the Jedi, and Kinberg would write and produce Episodes VIII and IX of the new Star Wars films. A week later the publication stated that Kasdan and Kinberg would be working on future Star Wars projects, but not necessarily on Episodes VIII and IX.

In television, he is an executive producer on ABC network's Designated Survivor starring Kiefer Sutherland, Legion created by Noah Hawley for FX, and The Gifted on Fox. He executive produced the third revival of the science fiction anthology series, The Twilight Zone which premiered in 2019.

In July 2019, it was announced that Kinberg and his production company Genre Films is leaving Fox after 20 years.

Personal life
Kinberg married Mali Heled in a Jewish ceremony on July 26, 2001. They have two sons. The couple separated in 2014 and were divorced in early 2017. By November 4, 2019, Kinberg became engaged to writer Cleo Wade. They have a daughter, born in 2020 and a second daughter in 2021.

Filmography

Film

Executive producer
 Abraham Lincoln: Vampire Hunter (2012)
 Death on the Nile (2022)
 A Haunting in Venice (2023)

Other credits

Television

Awards

He received a lifetime achievement award from the Saturn Awards in 2016.

He was named #61 on the list of 100 most powerful people in Hollywood by The Hollywood Reporter in 2016.

References

External links 

American male screenwriters
Brown University alumni
Columbia University School of the Arts alumni
Living people
Golden Globe Award-winning producers
Jewish American screenwriters
English emigrants to the United States
English Jewish writers
English male screenwriters
English television writers
Writers from Los Angeles
1973 births
Film producers from California
Screenwriters from California
21st-century American Jews